Tormod Caimbeul, (7 October 1942 – 2 May 2015) was a Scottish Gaelic novelist, poet, author of children's literature, and translator. He was known by his nickname "Tormod a' Bhocsair". He is recognised as one of the most important Gaelic writers of the 20th century.

Life 
Tormod Caimbeul was born in South Dell, Ness, Lewis. His father, Aonghas Caimbeul (nicknamed Am Bocsair), and his uncle, Aonghas Caimbeul (nicknamed Am Puilean), were both well-known Gaelic poets. Alasdair Caimbeul, Tormod's brother, is a Gaelic novelist and playwright. His daughter Catrìona Lexy Chaimbeul writers Gaelic fiction, poetry, and drama, and is also active as a director and actor.

After attending the University of Edinburgh and Jordanhill College of Education, he worked as a teacher of Gaelic and English in Glasgow, South Uist, and Lewis.

Writing 
Caimbeul published three novels during his lifetime: Deireadh an Fhoghair (1979), Shrapnel (2006), and An Druim bho Thuath (2011). His short stories appeared in three collections: Hostail (Hostel, 1992), An Naidheachd bhon Taigh (1994), and Sgeulachdan sa Chiaradh (2015). Shrapnel has been recently adapted for the stage by Catrìona Lexy Chaimbeul and the company Theatre Gu Leòr.

References 

Scottish Gaelic writers
1942 births
2015 deaths
People from the Isle of Lewis
Alumni of the University of Edinburgh
20th-century Scottish Gaelic poets
21st-century Scottish Gaelic poets
Scottish children's writers
Scottish translators
20th-century Scottish novelists
21st-century Scottish novelists
20th-century British translators